Miño is a municipality in the Spanish province of A Coruña in the autonomous community of Galicia. It belongs to the comarca of Betanzos. It has a population of 5,760 (Spanish 2011 Census) and an area of 33 km².

Municipalities in the Province of A Coruña